"Spit Out the Bone" is a song by American heavy metal band Metallica. It was released as the fifth single from their tenth studio album, Hardwired... to Self-Destruct (2016), on November 14, 2017, through Blackened Recordings. The song made its live debut at The O2 Arena in London on October 24, 2017. "Spit Out the Bone" has been regarded as a fan and critic favorite from the album. The song is featured on the soundtrack for the WWE 2K19 video game.

Background and composition

Regarding the song's meaning, Metallica vocalist and rhythm guitarist James Hetfield said:

Hetfield states the phrase "Spit Out the Bone" was taken from British punk rock band Charged GBH's song "Passenger on the Menu" from their 1982 album City Baby Attacked by Rats.

On the writing of the song, drummer Lars Ulrich said:

Robert Trujillo, Metallica's bassist, singled "Spit Out the Bone" as the song from Hardwired... to Self-Destruct that he looked most forward to performing. Metallica's lead guitarist, Kirk Hammett, called "Spit Out the Bone" the "Mount Everest" of the new album, alluding to its complexity and speed.

Music video

The music video of "Spit Out the Bone" was released on November 17, 2016, and was directed by Phil Mucci. In keeping with the song's transhumanistic themes, the video shows a group of renegade humans revolting against machine rule.  The music video was filmed in the Italian city of Matera.

Personnel

James Hetfield – lead vocals, rhythm guitar
Kirk Hammett – lead guitar
Robert Trujillo – bass
Lars Ulrich – drums

Charts

References

External links
Making of video on the official Metallica YouTube page.
Music video on the official Metallica YouTube page.

2016 songs
2017 singles
Metallica songs
Songs written by James Hetfield
Songs written by Lars Ulrich
Speed metal songs